Hannibal Rising is a 2007 psychological thriller drama film and the fifth film of the Hannibal Lecter franchise. It is a prequel to Red Dragon, Hannibal and The Silence of the Lambs. The film is an adaptation of Thomas Harris' 2006 novel of the same name and tells the story of Lecter's evolution from a vengeful Nazi hunter into a cannibalistic serial killer.

The film was directed by Peter Webber from a screenplay by Harris, and stars Gaspard Ulliel as the title character with additional roles played by Gong Li, Rhys Ifans and Dominic West. Filming took place at Barrandov Studios in Prague. It was co-produced by the United Kingdom, Czech Republic, France, Italy and the United States. It was released in France on February 7, 2007, and in Italy, United Kingdom, and the United States on February 9, 2007. It was produced by the Dino De Laurentiis Company and theatrical distribution was handled by Momentum Pictures in the U.K., and by The Weinstein Company and Metro-Goldwyn-Mayer in the U.S.. The film received generally negative reviews from critics, though Ulliel's performance as Lecter was generally praised. It grossed $82.2 million against a $50 million budget.

Plot
In 1944, eight-year-old Hannibal Lecter lives in Lecter Castle in Lithuania. The German invasion of the Soviet Union turns the Baltic region into part of the bloodiest front line of World War II. Lecter, his younger sister Mischa, and their parents travel to the family's hunting lodge in the woods to elude the advancing German troops. After three years, the Nazis are finally driven out of the countries soon to be re-occupied by the Soviet Union. During their retreat, they destroy a Soviet tank that had stopped at the Lecter family's lodge looking for water. The explosion kills everyone but Lecter and Mischa. They survive in the cottage until five former Lithuanian militia, led by a Nazi collaborator named Vladis Grutas, storm and loot it. Finding no other food in the bitterly cold Baltic winter, the men look menacingly at Lecter and Mischa.

In 1952, Lithuania is under Soviet rule and Lecter Castle has been converted into an orphanage, which also houses Hannibal. After dealing violently with a bully, Lecter escapes from the orphanage to Paris to live with his widowed aunt, Lady Murasaki. While in France, Lecter flourishes as a student. He commits his first murder as a teenager, killing a local butcher who insults his aunt. He is suspected of the murder by Inspector Pascal Popil, a French detective who also lost his family in the war. Thanks in part to his aunt's intervention, as she leaves the butcher's head on the gates in front of the station during Lecter's interview, Lecter escapes responsibility for the crime.

Lecter becomes the youngest person to be admitted to medical school in France. He works in Paris, where he is given a job preparing cadavers. One day, Lecter witnesses a condemned war criminal receiving a sodium thiopental injection, allowing him to recall details about his war crimes. Consequently, to recall the names of those responsible for his sister's death, Lecter injects himself with the solution. His subsequent flashback reveals the men who had killed Mischa and had cannibalized her as well. Lecter returns to Lithuania in search of his sister's remains. He excavates the ruins of the lodge where his family died and upon finding Mischa's remains, he gives her a proper burial. He also unearths the dog-tags of the deserters who killed his sister. One of them, Enrikas Dortlich, sees him arrive in the country and attempts to kill him but Lecter incapacitates him. After he buries Mischa's remains, Lecter forces Dortlich to reveal the whereabouts of the rest of his gang, then decapitates Dortlich with a horse-drawn pulley. Dortlich's blood splashes on Lecter's face, and he licks it off.

Lecter then visits the restaurant of another one of the soldiers, Petras Kolnas, in Fontainebleau. He finds his young daughter and notices Mischa's bracelet on her and gives her Kolnas's dogtag. Dortlich's murder puts the rest of the group on the alert and because of the similarity to the first murder, places Lecter under renewed suspicion from Popil. Grutas, now a sex trafficker, dispatches a second member of the group, Zigmas Milko, to kill him. Lecter kills Milko, drowning him in embalming chemicals inside his laboratory. Popil then tries to dissuade him from hunting the gang. During a confrontation with Lady Murasaki, she begs him not to get revenge. He refuses, claiming that he made a promise to Mischa. He then attacks Grutas in his home but Grutas is rescued by his bodyguards.

Grutas kidnaps Lady Murasaki and calls Lecter, using her as bait. Lecter recognizes the sounds of Kolnas's birds from his restaurant in the background. Lecter goes there and plays on Kolnas's emotions by threatening his children. Kolnas gives up the location of Grutas's boat but Lecter kills him when Kolnas goes for Lecter's gun. Lecter goes to the houseboat and finds Grutas assaulting Lady Murasaki. In a final confrontation, Grutas claims that Lecter had also consumed his sister in broth fed to him by the soldiers and he was killing them to keep this fact secret. Enraged by the revelation, Lecter eviscerates Grutas by repeatedly carving his sister's initial into his body. Lady Murasaki, finally disturbed by his behavior, flees from him even after he tells her that he loves her. The houseboat is incinerated and Lecter, assumed to be dead, emerges from the woods. He then hunts the last member of the group, Grentz, in Melville, Canada, before leaving for the United States.

Cast

 Gaspard Ulliel as Hannibal Lecter
 Aaran Thomas as young Hannibal Lecter
 Gong Li as Lady Murasaki
 Dominic West as Inspector Pascal Popil
 Rhys Ifans as Vladis Grutas
 Helena-Lia Tachovska as Mischa Lecter
 Kevin McKidd as Petras Kolnas
 Richard Brake as Enrikas Dortlich
 Stephen Walters as Zigmas Milko
 Ivan Marevich as Bronys Grentz
 Charles Maquignon as Paul Momund
 Ingeborga Dapkūnaitė as Mrs. Lecter
 Beata Ben Ammar as Madam Kolnas
 Pavel Bezdek as Dieter
 Goran Kostić as Kazys Porvik
 Robbie Kay as Kolnas's son
 Denis Ménochet as Chief of Police

Reception

Critical response 
On Rotten Tomatoes the film holds an approval rating of 16% based on 148 reviews, with an average rating of 4.10/10. The website's critics consensus reads: "Hannibal Rising reduces the horror icon to a collection of dime-store psychological traits." Metacritic assigned the film a weighted average score of 35 out of 100 based on 30 critics, indicating "generally unfavorable" reviews.  Audiences polled by CinemaScore gave the film an average grade of "B–" on an A+ to F scale.

The film was nominated for, but did not win, two Golden Raspberry Awards. They were for Worst Prequel or Sequel (lost to Daddy Day Camp) and Worst Excuse for a Horror Movie (lost to I Know Who Killed Me).

Box office
The film opened at No. 2 in the United States with $13.4 million from 3,003 theaters, finishing behind Norbit ($33.7 million), which was released during the same week as Hannibal Rising. In its second week of release, Hannibal Rising dropped to No. 7 at the U.S. box office, making $5.5 million, a 58.5% drop from the previous week. It dropped out of the top 10 U.S. grossing films in its third week of release at No. 13 with $1.7 million (a 68.5% drop). After a theatrical release of 91 days, the final total North American domestic gross of the film was $27.7 million, less than the opening weekend gross of both Hannibal (2001) and Red Dragon (2002) ($58 million and $36.5 million, respectively). It grossed a total of $82.1 million worldwide.

Home media
 
The DVD was released in the United States on 29 May 2007, debuted at No. 1 and sold 480,861 units in the opening weekend, generating revenue of $10,574,133. As of February 2023, the film has grossed $24,295,206 from DVD sales alone. Blu-ray sales or DVD rentals are not included.

The DVD extras include an unrated version of the film, audio commentary by director Peter Webber and producer Martha De Laurentiis, five deleted scenes with optional commentary from the director, promo spots, and a 16- minute featurette titled "Hannibal Lecter: The Origin Of Evil", featuring interviews with the cast and crew and behind-the-scenes footage.

Explanatory notes

References

External links
 
 
 
 
 Cinefantastique Online Review 

2007 films
2007 horror films
Hannibal Lecter films
Prequel films
American films about revenge
American horror films
2000s English-language films
English-language French films
British horror films
French horror films
2000s German-language films
2000s Russian-language films
Films about Nazi hunters
Films about Nazi fugitives
Films based on American horror novels
Films about cannibalism
Films set in castles
Films set in France
Films set in Germany
Films set in Lithuania
Films set in Canada
Films set in Paris
Films set in 1944
Films set in the 1950s
Films shot in France
Films shot in Lithuania
Films shot in the Czech Republic
British serial killer films
American serial killer films
Films produced by Dino De Laurentiis
Films produced by Martha De Laurentiis
Films scored by Ilan Eshkeri
Films scored by Shigeru Umebayashi
Films directed by Peter Webber
Metro-Goldwyn-Mayer films
The Weinstein Company films
2000s American films
2000s British films
American prequel films
British prequel films
Czech prequel films
French prequel films
Italian prequel films
2000s French films
Czech psychological drama films
Czech psychological thriller films
Czech serial killer films